Open Air St. Gallen is an annual music festival held near the city of St. Gallen, Switzerland. Founded in 1977, it is one of Switzerland's biggest and longest-running open air festivals. It is attended by more than 110,000 people each year.

References

External links

 

Music festivals in Switzerland
Music festivals established in 1977
Tourist attractions in St. Gallen (city)